Roeloffina van Heteren-Vink (1875-1971) was a Dutch artist.

Biography 
Van Heteren-Vink née Vink was born on 1 April 1875 in Utrecht. She was married to W.J. van Heteren. Her work was included in the 1939 exhibition and sale Onze Kunst van Heden (Our Art of Today) at the Rijksmuseum in Amsterdam. She was a member of the Kunstl Liefde in  Utrecht.

Van Heteren-Vink died on 3 January 1971  in The Hague.

References

1875 births
1971 deaths
Artists from Utrecht
20th-century Dutch women artists